The following is a list of symbols of the U.S. state of Hawaii.

State symbols

Hawaii state auana (modern) musical instrument: Ukulele
Hawaii state bird:  Nēnē (Branta sandvicensis), also known as the Hawaiian goose
Hawaii state dance:  Hula
Hawaii state endemic tree:  ʻŌhiʻa lehua (Metrosideros polymorpha)
Hawaii state fish:  Humuhumunukunukuāpuaa  (Rhinecanthus rectangulus), also known as the reef triggerfish
Hawaii state flag:  Flag of the State of Hawaii
Hawaii state flower:  Pua aloalo or mao hau hele (Hibiscus brackenridgei A. Gray), also known as the native yellow hibiscus
Hawaii state gem:  Ēkaha kū moana,* also known as black coral
Hawaii state individual sport: Hee nalu,* also known as surfing 
Hawaii state insect: Pulelehua (Vanessa tameamea), also known as the Kamehameha butterfly
Hawaii state kahiko (traditional) musical instrument: Pahu
Hawaii state land mammal: Ōpeapea (Lasiurus cinereus semotus), also known as the Hawaiian hoary bat
Hawaii state language:  Hawaiian language, English language
Hawaii state mammal:  Īlioholoikauaua* (Neomonachus schauinslandi), also known as the Hawaiian monk seal
Hawaii state marine mammal:  Koholā* (Megaptera novaeangliae),* also known as the humpback whale 
Hawaii state microbe: Flavobacterium akiainvivens (proposed)
Hawaii state motto:  "Ua mau ke ea o ka aina i ka pono" ("The life of the land is perpetuated in righteousness") 
Hawaii state plant:  Kalo (Colocasia esculenta (L.) Schott), also known as taro 
Hawaii state popular name:  "The Aloha State" 
Hawaii state seal:  Great Seal of the State of Hawaii
Hawaii state song:  "Hawaii Ponoī" 
Hawaii state spirit:  The Aloha Spirit 
Hawaii state team sport: Heihei waa,* also known as outrigger canoe paddling
Hawaii state tartan:  Hawaii State Tartan (unofficial)
Hawaii state tree:  Kukui tree (Aleurites moluccanus), also known as the candlenut tree
United States quarter dollar - Hawaii 2008

*  - Indicates that the word or term is not explicitly mentioned in the Hawaii state statute officially designating the referenced symbol.

Island colors and flowers or lei materials
In addition to the state symbols, each major island has an official color and either an official flower or an official lei material.

See also
Outline of Hawaii
List of U.S. state, district, and territorial insignia
Hawaii

References

External links
Hawaii State Symbols

State symbols
Hawaii